Daniel Nwosu Jr. (born March 22, 1994), professionally known by his stage name Dax (often stylized as DAX),  is a Nigerian Canadian rapper, singer, and songwriter.

Early life
Daniel Nwosu Jr. was born on March 22, 1994, in St. John's, Newfoundland and Labrador. He grew up in Ottawa and moved to Wichita to attend university, after school he lived in Detroit for a short period before moving to Los Angeles, California. He attended the Newman University, where he played guard for the Newman Jets basketball team. He initially wrote poetry and was a motivational speaker prior to pursuing a rap career. During his tenure at Newman University he worked as a janitor, which he claimed was a job he liked because he was able to work on building his rap career in his spare time from work.

Career
Dax decided to write up a poem as he rode on a bus with his basketball team in 2016. After impressing one of his teammates with the poem, Dax realized he had a knack for putting words together. He began seriously releasing and promoting music through his SoundCloud account dropping mixtape 2pac Reincarnation Vol 2: As Told By Dax in 2017, He rose to fame for the official music video of his song "Cash Me Outside" featuring Danielle Bregoli.

He released his first extended play in August 2018, entitled "It’s Different Now" which features guest appearances from other rappers including OT Genasis and Futuristic. The following year, he was featured on Hopsin's song "You Should've Known". In June 2019, he went on "It goes up" tour with Tech N9ne and then later announced his first solo headlining tour "It's Different  Now Tour" via Instagram and scheduled to tour in October across America and Canada.

The song was praised by the critics for its subject matter and lyricism, the music video of the song has over 50 million views on YouTube and has been streamed more than 50 million times on Spotify. Later that year he released two more singles, "Faster" and "I don't want another sorry" featuring Tech N9ne and Trippie Redd respectively. In April 2020, he released the single "Coronavirus (State Of Emergency)", which was written about the COVID-19 pandemic.

In July 2021, Dax released a sequel to "Dear God" called "Child of God" in which he responded by thanking God for what he had done for him. In August  2021, Dax announced his debut studio album and released "Propaganda" featuring Tom Macdonald as album's lead single. The song peaked at number 15 on the Billboard'''s R&B/Hip-Hop Digital Song Sales chart  and at number 9 on the Rap Digital Song Sales chart. In early October 2021, album's third single  "40 Days, 40 Nights" featuring Nasty C was released. On October 15, 2021, his debut studio album  Pain Paints Paintings was released digitally through Living Legends Entertainment. 

On March 11, 2022, he released a new single titled "Dear Alcohol", the song was written about alcoholism. It debuted at number 9 on the Bubbling Under Hot 100 and at 28 on the U.S. Hot Country Songs chart, and was eventually certified Gold by both the RIAA and Music Canada. In the song, Dax has reflected on his toxic relationship with alcohol admitting to the times in his life when he "got wasted" because he didn't want to be alone with himself, he wrote on YouTube while promoting the single that, "This one is very personal to me". On June 10, 2022, he released a country music crossover remix for the song featuring vocals from country singer Elle King.

Artistry
Style and influence
Initially, Dax did not take rap seriously because of his interest in basketball but there was a phase where he grew up listening to Tupac. He was never really a big fan of rap but he started listening to hip-hop when Drake took over the scene. Dax has also cited artists like 50 Cent and Lil Wayne. He compares his style to artists such as Tech N9ne, Eminem, and Hopsin.

Feuds
KSI
On November 18, 2018 KSI appeared on the What's Good? Podcast, where he called out various internet rappers. In the interview KSI said both Quadeca and Dax were worse than him at rapping. Quadeca went on to post a full diss track against him on November 23, 2018, called "Insecure". Shortly after, Dax also responded with his own diss track, which was a remix of Eminem's diss track toward Machine Gun Kelly, "Killshot". KSI then responded to Dax and Quadeca's track with a reaction video, also accompanied by a diss track called "Ares".

He challenged Dax to a private boxing match, with Dax accepting but repeatedly delaying it. He then later appeared on Deji's diss track "Unforgivable" against KSI.

Tory Lanez
On January 24, 2019, Tory Lanez claimed through a tweet that he is the "best rapper alive". Dax responded by posting a video on YouTube, featuring a diss track titled "I'm Not Joyner Or Don Q" aimed at him. Lanez posted a video on Instagram in response in which he pressures Dax to apologize for the diss track. Dax addressed the situation in interviews with DJ Akademiks, Impaulsive, and No Jumper'', saying that apologizing was the right thing to do because he did not want a fight to break out.

Discography

Studio albums

Extended plays

Mixtapes

Singles

As lead artist

As featured artist

Notes

References

External links
 Official Website
 Dax at AllMusic
 Dax at IMDb

1994 births
Living people
21st-century Black Canadian male singers
21st-century Canadian male musicians
21st-century Canadian male singers
21st-century Canadian rappers
21st-century Nigerian musicians
Black Canadian musicians
Canadian contemporary R&B singers
Canadian people of Igbo descent
Canadian Christians
Canadian male rappers
Canadian male singer-songwriters
Hardcore hip hop artists
Musicians from St. John's, Newfoundland and Labrador
Music YouTubers
Nigerian Christians
Nigerian male musicians
Nigerian male rappers
Nigerian musicians
Newman University, Wichita alumni
Songwriters from Kansas
Songwriters from California